The Palladium Fantasy Role-Playing Game (often shortened to Palladium Fantasy or PFRPG) is a game produced by Palladium Books. It is set in the Palladium world (use of the unofficial name "Palladia" is discouraged by the publisher) some 10,000 years after a great war between the elves and dwarves. First published in July 1983 as The Palladium Role-Playing Game, the Palladium Fantasy Role-Playing Game saw a second edition in April 1996. The two are largely compatible, though the second edition uses a later iteration of Palladium's ruleset to be more compatible with the rest of their Megaverse.

Setting

Race 
Like many fantasy games, the Palladium Fantasy Role-Playing Game includes many different sentient races as playable characters. 

 Humans: the dominant race in the Palladium world, they seized control and spread after the elves diminished in their struggles with the Old Ones, Gods, the Dwarves and everyone else the Elves irritated.
 Elves: the first race, beautiful, long-lived, elegant, with great potential for magic. The most powerful Wizard who ever lived, Lictalon, was an elf, who fought alongside Thoth in the Age of Chaos and the Age of  Light.
 Dwarves: mountain-dwelling, dowdy, self-interested, cleaving to their own small dwellings, dwarves are sought-after craftsmen, Alchemists and warriors. Ever since the Elf-Dwarf War they have sworn off the use of magic.
 Gnomes: a small, cheerful race once living in a vast subterranean Republic, gnomes had their homeland destroyed and have scatted to other lands in a vast diaspora. Helpful, clever, and tough, gnomes are a small echo, perhaps of the faeries that once wandered Palladium.
Troglodytes: a peaceful, somewhat dim, subterranean race of humanoids that live in tunnel villages. A rare sight outside their caves most other races have little opinion of them. They prefer to hide rather than fight but if there is no other option they will fight with a surprising ferocity.
 Kobolds: wiry, subterranean humanoids who tend to be wicked and self-interested
 Goblins: small, ugly, stupid humanoids, some of whom have remnants of faerie magic
 Orcs: a human-sized race with some small faerie blood. A more savage version of humanity.
 Ogres: large, strong, primitive humans
 Trolls: huge, burly, stupid, faerie-blooded; often the henchlings of other races
 Changelings: grey, fat-blooded, physically weak magic race with a vast potential for psychic powers and an innate shape-shifting ability.
 Wolfen: large, humanoid wolves who have, in the past century, established their own Empire in the extreme north of the continent

In Palladium there isn't much racial inter-breeding.

Class 
There are also a variety of classes available in Palladium, divided into:

 Men at Arms: warriors who rely on their strength and cunning and weapons
 Men of Magic: those who have the Gift, and use their PPE (Potential Psychic Energy) to work feats of wonder harkening back to the Time of a Thousand Magics
 Clergy: the Touched who have the Gods' power upon them - for Light or Dark
 Optional Occupational Character Classes (O.C.C.s): these are largely for NPCs or the previous classes of adventurers
 Psychic Character Classes (P.C.C.s): given the Gift to transform Potential Psychic Energy into Inner Strength (IS), these characters wield incredible abilities tapping into their own internal willpower.  

Character classes determine which skills are available to the character, grant access to abilities like SpellCasting, psionic, etc. Characters can leave one class to pursue another - and this is even the basis of some Advanced OCCs like the Alchemist.

History of the Palladium world 
The history of the Palladium world is divided into several "ages", each corresponding to certain events and differing levels of ambient magical energy. While there are many historians in the Palladium world, the best known historical text is the Tristine Chronicles, of which several different versions exist. Most copies are incomplete, but it is regarded as the authority on Palladium history.

Any chronological account of the Palladium world must necessarily begin with the Old Ones.

The Age of Chaos 
Their dominance constituted an Age of Chaos, abounding in magical energy, of which only myth and conflicting interpretations of scant historical evidence (found within the pages of the Tristine Chronicles) remain. From this, it cannot be conclusively determined whether the Old Ones themselves were progenitors of the universe entire or just one of numerous factors inscribed as part of the cosmological formula in which every being and plane of existence locates its respective origin. Either way, these entities were ancient beyond all reckoning and possessed of powers that defied comprehension (similar to the Great Old Ones found in the works of H. P. Lovecraft). While their true appearance is unknown, the Old Ones were most often depicted as amorphous mounds of flesh covered with swarming tentacles, unblinking eyes, and gaping maws. Each one laying claim to a particular aspect of evil, they feasted with impunity upon the suffering and attendant dark emotions that resulted from various torments inflicted upon those bound to their oppressive rule. Not only credited with the development of magic in myriad forms (a mere handful survived into the present, but none are fully intact), the Old Ones also gave rise to an untold number of races (only the elf, Titan, and changeling have endured), alongside a legion of slaves from other dimensions. Foremost among these, dragons conspired to bring about the Old Ones' downfall. They eventually convinced Ya-Blik (envy) and Al-vil (betrayal) to ensnare Xy (greatest of the Old Ones and representation of power incarnate) within a magical construct of his own design. As a result, Xy was transformed into Thoth, lord of wisdom and distinguished member of the Pantheon of Light, all memories of his prior self irrevocably erased. 

Open revolt was soon underway, and the archaic races, accompanied by Spirits and Gods of Light, used this opportunity to rise up against their former masters. At long last, in the wake of all-encompassing destruction and bloodshed, the Old Ones were subdued, placed in an enchanted slumber, and imprisoned in the nether regions of the universe through the combined might of Thoth, the elven mage Lictalon, the dragon Kym-nark-mar, and the angel Lo-kum. Although certain vestiges of the Old Ones' presence and influence managed to escape the ensuing campaign of eradication, the world and its inhabitants were able to establish a new order in their (relative) absence.

The Age of Light 
Following the Age of Chaos was the Age of Light, which was a time of very high ambient magic. It is during this time that humans first appear in history, and religious wars begin as rival gods contend for worshipers. This period is known to be very long, but essentially indeterminate in length and time.

Time of a Thousand Magics 
Sometime after the Age of Light was the Time of a Thousand Magicks. While magic was not substantially more powerful than during the Age of Light, it was at this point that magic reached a point of great diversity. This led to elves gaining great influence across the middle of the continent, and dwarves developing rune magic: the art of trapping souls in indestructible objects.

The Elf-Dwarf War 
The elf and dwarf empires grew in strength, and cooperated closely for centuries, but the dwarves grew resentful of elven high-handedness, and the elves suspected the dwarves of scheming. This resulted in the Elf–Dwarf War, which nearly destroyed the two empires, as each tried to outdo the other in magical atrocities. It culminated with the destruction of the Golden City of Baalgor, and the creation of the Baalgor Wastelands.

Following the war, dwarves forever foreswore magic, and both cooperated to purge the world of "evil" magic, sparing only a few types which they judged worthy of remaining in a Millennium of Purification. Many other traditions of magic went underground or to other worlds, however, or survived in a few members who have since spread.

The Age of Man... and Wolfen? 
Since that time, ten thousand years ago, humans have become the dominant race on the planet, controlling four of the major kingdoms or confederacies. In the past fifty years, the Wolfen of the Northern Wilderness have become highly organized, developing a society which now clashes regularly with humans in the Eastern Territories.

Geography and politics 
The game takes place on a single continent and several nearby islands. The extreme south of the world is tropical, having a jungle on the western coast, while the extreme northern portions of the country are subarctic forest. Given the size of the continent (approximately 2,500 miles north to south), this makes the planet slightly larger than Mars. The continent represents only part of the world, but it was revealed in the first edition supplement Island at the Edge of the World that the game setting is surrounded by a large, impenetrable black wall for unknown reasons. Land of the Damned Two: Eternal Torment also revealed that there are other lands on the Palladium world that were not involved in the war against the Old Ones.

Politically, there are several nations and several alliances amongst races. Humans are allied to both elves and dwarves, though those two races still maintain personal hostility because of the Elf–Dwarf War. Humans are in charge of the Western Empire, a decadent empire which lies between the two inland seas of the continent. The Eastern Territories are also called the "Domain of Man" and have a large population of humans as well as elves and some dwarves. Immediately north of the Eastern Territories is the Wolfen Empire which is open to all races, though it is dominated by Wolfen and is somewhat suspicious of humans due to long-running conflicts with the Eastern Territories over some disputed land. To the south of the Eastern Territories is the predominantly human kingdom of Timiro. In between the Western Empire and the Eastern Territories lies the Old Kingdom, the former center of elven civilization, now populated by large numbers of orcs, ogres, and similar monsters. South of the Old Kingdom is the giant-run kingdom of Mount Nimro, which is centered around two volcanoes. West of Mount Nimro is the Land of the South Winds, of which only sketchy information has been presented, and the Baalgor Wastelands, created at the very end of the Elf–Dwarf War as the result of a catastrophic dwarven attack which destroyed the elven capital. Southwest of the Baalgor Wastelands and west of the Land of the South Winds are the Yin-Sloth Jungles.

Magic and psionics 
The Palladium world is a magical world, with several different kinds of magic practiced, as well as psychic powers. In the past, many more types of magic were practiced, but immediately after the Elf-Dwarf War, a Millennium of Purification saw the end of many types of "questionable" magic. The major remaining forms of magic are:
 Wizardry (spell-casting), 
 Diabolism (magical writing, used for wards and empowerment), 
 Summoning (using magic circles to protect, to bind demons and other creatures, or activate various powers), 
 Alchemy (creating magic items), 
 Elementalism (in which a person, known as a Warlock, uses a special bond with one or two classical elements to cast spells and summon elementals), 
 Witchcraft (in which a person signs a pact with a demon, trading souls, servitude, or other favors in exchange for power), 
 Priestly Magic (Powers granted by the Gods of Light or Dark)
 Druidism (nature magic). 
 Psychic powers are also common, though several races lack any psionic potential at all. Those characters whose race does have psychic potential have a chance to possess a few powers, regardless of their O.C.C. 

All of these operate on Palladium's standard system of magic being powered by Potential Psychic Energy (P.P.E.), and psychic powers being fueled by Inner Strength Points (I.S.P.), both working like magic points.

Game materials and information

First edition 
Core rule book
The Palladium Role-Playing Game (First edition: July 1983; Revised edition: June 1984) [out of print]

Regional adventure guides
The Arms of Nargash-Tor (March 1984) [out of print]
Book II: Old Ones (November 1984) [out of print]
Book III: Adventures on the High Seas (May 1987) [out of print]
Book IV: Adventures in the Northern Wilderness (October 1989) [out of print]
Book V: "Further" Adventures in the Northern Wilderness (April 1990) [out of print] – Focuses upon the mountain range that sequesters the Great Northern Wilderness from encroaching human settlement in the Eastern Territory.
Book VI: Island at the Edge of the World (September 1993) - A rare "adventure" book as opposed to Palladium Books' usual "Worldbook" format. The regional information, though secondary to the adventure, is also notable for being some of the only published details of the Old Kingdom Mountains, as planned sourcebooks for this region have yet to be produced.
Book VII: Yin-Sloth Jungles (October 1994) – Unveils the heretofore mysterious and primitive Yin-Sloth Jungles and its inhabitants, monstrous and otherwise.

Supplemental sourcebooks & other support material
The Palladium Role-Playing Game Shield (copyright date 1984) [out of print]
Monsters & Animals (First edition: July 1985; Revised edition: October 1988) [out of print]

Second edition 
Core rule book
Palladium Fantasy Role-Playing Game, Second Edition (April 1996) – The only book needed to begin play; others can help, but are optional.

Regional adventure guides
Book II: Old Ones, Second Edition (June 1996) – Describes communities and forts in the Timiro Kingdom, also gives information about the Old Ones, minotaurs, and the Place of Magic.
Book 3: Adventures on the High Seas, Second Edition (December 1996) – Navigates the expanse of ocean surrounding the Palladium world, making stops at several islands along the way.
Book 8: The Western Empire (September 1998) – Covers the oldest, most powerful, and perhaps greatest realm of humankind: its cities and people, governing bodies, conspiracies and intrigue, history, and plans for the future.
Book 9: The Baalgor Wastelands (March 1999) – Introduces a desolate region claimed by nomadic monster races, once the center of ancient elven civilization but laid to waste during their war against the dwarves.
Book 10: Mount Nimro—Kingdom of Giants (May 1999) – Ventures into the domain of giants: a gathering of clans, tribes, and refugees quickly becoming both a true "kingdom" and a perceived threat to nearby communities.
Book 11: Eastern Territory (April 2001) – Surveys a land of opportunity that has, for the time being, managed to achieve a precarious balance amidst heated disputes and contentious claims of dominion.
Book 12: Library of Bletherad (July 2000) – Details a fabled repository of knowledge and secrets on the island of Y-Oda.
Book 13: Northern Hinterlands (June 2001) – Charts the area of the Great Northern Wilderness just outside the mountains that divide the Land of the Damned from the rest of the world.
Land of the Damned One: Chaos Lands (December 2001) – Journeys through an isolated and previously unexplored region meant to contain unrepentant servants of the Old Ones, holdouts from a dark age not quite past.
Land of the Damned Two: Eternal Torment (June 2002)
Wolfen Empire (February 2003) – Outlines the society, land holdings, and culture of the canine races, helping to set the stage for an upcoming war between Wolfen and humankind over possession of the Disputed Lands. Reprints material from first edition Book IV and Book V.
Bizantium and the Northern Islands(2015)
Garden of the Gods(2020)

Supplemental sourcebooks
Monsters & Animals (August 1996)
Dragons & Gods (December 1996)
Mysteries of Magic—Book One: The Heart of Magic (September 2009)

Reception
In the May 1984 edition of Dragon (Issue 85), Ken Rolston thought this RPG compared very favourably to the industry giant, AD&D. His only caveat was that for the relatively high price — $20 — it should have included a box, dice and other player materials. However, he admired  the "Attractive combat and skill systems. First-class magical character classes — complete with magical circles, mystic symbols, and elemental magics — offer simple but comprehensive fantasy magic. Nice treatment of alignments and deities. Contains an outline of a campaign world and a brief but imaginative introductory scenario." However, he concluded that since it was only a book, "At a price of $20 for a paperback, only a fair value."  

In the May-June 1985 edition of Space Gamer (Issue No. 74), Jerry Epperson was more ambivalent, saying "The Palladium Role-Playing Game is a game that aspired to greatness but fell just a little short of the mark. With the advent of RuneQuest, The Fantasy Trip, and Lands of Adventure, Palladium is just a little out of step. GMs who are looking to add spice to their D&D games, or who really don't demand a great deal of realism from game mechanics, should by all means pick up Palladium. But if you're searching for the ultimate in 'realism' and innovative design . . . keep looking." 

In the November 1987 edition of Dragon (Issue 127), Ken Rolston reviewed the regional adventure guide Adventures on the High Seas, published in 1987, and found much to his liking: "The Palladium fantasy campaign world is full of magic and monsters, just like FRP campaigns should be, and this pack contains a little bit of everything, from orcs and lost temples to pirates and crazed cult assassins... What it lacks in organization and sophistication it more than makes up for in enthusiasm and imagination." Ten years later, in the December 1997 edition of Dragon (Issue 242), Rick Swan reviewed the second edition of Adventures on the High Seas, published in 1996, and called it "another winner." He rated the book 5 out of 6, saying, "The seafaring stuff [is] the best of its kind I’ve ever seen."    

Andy Butcher reviewed Palladium Fantasy RPG 2nd Edition for Arcane magazine, rating it a 7 out of 10 overall. Butcher comments that "if you haven't got any of the other [Palladium] games and your campaign is based firmly in the Palladium World, then there's a great deal of useful stuff here."

In a 1996 reader poll conducted by Arcane magazine to determine the 50 most popular roleplaying games of all time, The Palladium Fantasy RPG was ranked 26th. Editor Paul Pettengale commented: "Well, the rules are almost identical to those in Palladium's Rifts roleplaying system, and as such it's well suited to existing players of that game, who will have little to learn. Even newcomers should have little difficulty with The Palladium Fantasy RPG, though. The rules lie somewhere between AD&D and Rolemaster in complexity, and combine character classes with a simple skills system. A good alternative to the better known Fantasy RPGs."

Notes

References

External links 
Palladium Fantasy Role-Playing Game official discussion board at Palladium Books Forums of the Megaverse
Palladium Fantasy at RPG Geek Database
Palladium Fantasy at RPGnet Game Index

Megaverse (Palladium Books)
Fantasy role-playing games
Palladium Fantasy Role-Playing Game
Role-playing games introduced in 1983
Dwarves in popular culture